Cutty Sark for Maritime Greenwich is a light metro station on the Docklands Light Railway (DLR) Bank-Lewisham Line in Greenwich, south-east London, so named for its proximity to the Cutty Sark in the Maritime Greenwich district. It is the most central of the Greenwich DLR stations, being situated in Greenwich town centre.

Location
The northernmost of the Greenwich DLR stations, Cutty Sark for Maritime Greenwich is located in the Maritime Greenwich district of south-eastern London. Its name comes from the clipper ship named Cutty Sark which is housed  to the north of the station. A number of well-known tourist attractions are in the surrounding area, including the National Maritime Museum, Royal Observatory, Greenwich Hospital, Greenwich foot tunnel, Trinity College of Music, and the Old Royal Naval College.

It is located close to the south bank of the River Thames and is below ground. Along with all other stations on the Lewisham extension, it is in Travelcard Zones 2 and 3, with passengers charged the lower of two possible fares.

History
Cutty Sark station opened on 3 December 1999 as part of a  extension of the DLR from its former southern terminus of Island Gardens southwards to Lewisham. Since its opening, the extension has seen growth as a result of it connecting, along with two National Rail connections, the Canary Wharf financial centre with Greenwich.

Station layout
One of only three completely underground stations on the DLR network, Cutty Sark station has an island platform with a track each side of it. This is similar to its cross-river sister station, Island Gardens.

The need for increased capacity has posed issues for the station. While most on the network have had their platforms extended as part of Transport for London's three-carriage capacity enhancement project, the two-car-long island platform at Cutty Sark cannot be lengthened due to cost (estimated at £30m) and risk of damage to the heritage site at street level. This is addressed by using selective door operation, allowing three-car trains to stop at the station by only having the doors near the centre of the train open in both end carriages; the first and last two sets of doors on each train do not open. Customers are warned of the need to move to the centre to leave the train by on-board announcements. A similar situation applies at Elverson Road.

Services
Cutty Sark serves trains on two branches: Bank to Lewisham and Stratford to Lewisham. The former runs at frequencies of up to four minutes between trains, while the latter only runs during morning peak hours; at other times trains from Stratford terminate at Canary Wharf.  Passengers bound for Tower Gateway, Beckton, or Woolwich Arsenal must change at Poplar or Westferry.

Connections
London Buses routes 188, 199 and night routes N1 and N199 serve the station.

Nearby places of interest

Gallery

References

External links
 Docklands Light Railway website - Cutty Sark station page

Docklands Light Railway stations in the Royal Borough of Greenwich
Railway stations in Great Britain opened in 1999
Railway stations located underground in the United Kingdom